Fatma El Sharnouby (born November 18, 1997) is an Egyptian middle-distance runner. She competed at the 2016 Summer Olympics in the women's 800 metres race; her time of 2:21.24 in the heats did not qualify her for the semifinals.

References

1997 births
Living people
Egyptian female middle-distance runners
Olympic athletes of Egypt
Athletes (track and field) at the 2016 Summer Olympics
Athletes (track and field) at the 2014 Summer Youth Olympics